Billy Martin successfully defended his title, defeating Ashok Amritraj in the final, 6–2, 6–1 to win the boys' singles tennis title at the 1974 Wimbledon Championships.

Draw

Finals

Top half

Section 1

Section 2

Bottom half

Section 3

Section 4

References

External links

Boys' Singles
Wimbledon Championship by year – Boys' singles